Barinov (masculine) or Barinova (feminine) is a Russian surname. Notable people with the surname include:

Alexey Barinov (born 1951), Russian businessman and politician
Dmitri Barinov (born 1996), Russian footballer
Yuri Barinov (born 1955), Russian Soviet cyclist

Russian-language surnames